The men's 4x400 metres relay event at the 2008 World Junior Championships in Athletics was held in Bydgoszcz, Poland, at Zawisza Stadium on 12 and 13 July.

Medalists

Results

Final
13 July

Heats
12 July

Heat 1

Heat 2

Heat 3

Participation
According to an unofficial count, 101 athletes from 24 countries participated in the event.

References

4 x 400 metres relay
Relays at the World Athletics U20 Championships